Macrobrochis is a genus of moths in the subfamily Arctiinae first described by Gottlieb August Wilhelm Herrich-Schäffer in 1855.

Species
 Macrobrochis alba (Fang, 1990)
 Macrobrochis albifascia (Fang, 1982)
 Macrobrochis albovenosa Černý, 1990
 Macrobrochis borneensis Roepke, 1939
 Macrobrochis dirhabdus (Rothschild, 1920)
 Macrobrochis fukiensis (Daniel, 1952)
 Macrobrochis gigas Walker, 1854
 Macrobrochis grahami (Schaus, 1924)
 Macrobrochis hampsoni (Schaus, 1924)
 Macrobrochis holosericea (Hampson, 1901)
 Macrobrochis infernalis Roepke, 1938
 Macrobrochis lucida (Fang, 1990)
 Macrobrochis nigra (Daniel, 1952)
 Macrobrochis nigripes (Hampson, 1900)
 Macrobrochis notabilis Kishida, 1992
 Macrobrochis tibetensis (Fang, 1990)
 Macrobrochis volzi (Weymer, 1909)

Former species
 Macrobrochis cocciniceps Mabille, 1884
 Macrobrochis pallens Hampson, 1894
 Macrobrochis prasena (Moore, 1859)
 Macrobrochis semirufa Hampson, 1896
 Macrobrochis splendens Butler, 1877
 Macrobrochis staudingeri Alphéraky, 1897

References

External links

Lithosiina
Moth genera